Jules Néraud (9 April 1795, in La Châtre – 11 April 1855, in La Châtre) was a French botanist, who collected spermatophytes in France, Mauritius, and Réunion, but is best known as a friend of George Sand.

References

External links
George Sand préface à La Botanique de l'Enfance, from www.henri-sch.net
La botanique de l'enfance par Jules Néraud

1795 births
1855 deaths
19th-century French botanists